Lake Guanoco (Spanish: Lago Guanoco or Lago de Asfalto de Guanoco, also Lake Bermudez) is the world's second largest natural tar pit and lies in Venezuela in northern South America.

Lake Guanoco is one of the five natural asphalt lake areas in the world, the others being Pitch Lake in Trinidad and Tobago and La Brea Tar Pits (Los Angeles), McKittrick Tar Pits (McKittrick) and Carpinteria Tar Pits (Carpinteria) all located in the US state of California.

Geography

  Even though Lake Guanoco is larger in area than Trinidad's Pitch Lake, it is smaller in volume; nevertheless its tar is purer.

Lake Guanoco is also different from other asphalt lakes as it is covered in vegetation.

Geology
All asphalt lakes were probably created during the Pleistocene epoch and share the same geological principle.

Asphalt lakes are the largest examples of natural  oil seeps. They occur when oil migrating toward the surface as a result of buoyancy (oil is lighter than ground water) actually reaches the surface, instead of being trapped in deeper stratigraphic layers. The reason the petroleum becomes asphaltic,  or tarry, is the action of oil-metabolizing bacteria. This process of biodegradation occurs close to the earth's surface, where temperatures are low enough for the bacteria to thrive, and where the oil is surrounded by fresh meteoric water.

History
It is unknown when Lake Guanoco was discovered, it has been known for a long time by the Warao people who used the asphalt for their canoes.

In 1799 German Explorer Alexander von Humboldt described the site during his Latin American expedition as "The spring of the good priest" ("Quelle des guten Priesters").

In 1883 the government of Venezuela signed a contract with Americans Horacio R. Hamilton and Jorge A. Phillips who received concessions for 25 years to mine asphalt. This concession caused some debate as the profits went to foreign companies.

In 1890 the mining started by the New York & Bermúdez Company, a subsidiary of General Asphalt based in New York. In 1899 the government under Cipriano Castro put higher taxes on the company; in response the company supported politically the opposing side under Manuel Antonio Matos. The conflict escalated and culminated in 1902-1903 in the "Asphalt War / Venezuelan conflict". The conflict even led to a temporary interruption in the diplomatic relations with the USA between June and December 1908, after Castro had expropriated the company.

In 1934 the commercial mining of the asphalt stopped and has not been re-established since.

References

External links
 About Lake Guanoco asphalt lake
 Map of Lake Guanoco
 Older picture (1917) of Lake Guanoco
 Picture of Lake Guanoco

Bermudez
Landforms of Venezuela
Geography of Sucre (state)
PDVSA